Epiboxidine is a chemical compound which acts as a partial agonist at neural nicotinic acetylcholine receptors, binding to both the α3β4 and the α4β2 subtypes. It was developed as a less toxic analogue of the potent frog-derived alkaloid epibatidine, which is around 200 times stronger than morphine as an analgesic but produces extremely dangerous toxic nicotinic side effects.

Epiboxidine is around one-tenth as potent as epibatidine as an α4β2 agonist, but has around the same potency as an α3β4 agonist. It has only one-tenth of the analgesic power of epibatidine, but is also much less toxic.

Uses 

Despite its decreased potency and toxicity compared to epibatidine, epiboxidine itself is still too toxic to be developed as a drug for use in humans. It is used in scientific research and as a parent compound to derive newer analogues which may be safer and have greater potential for clinical development.

See also 
 ABT-418

References 

Analgesics
Nicotinic agonists
Stimulants
Isoxazoles
Nitrogen heterocycles